Chondropsis may refer to:
 Chondropsis (sponge), a genus of sponges in the family Chondropsidae
 Chondropsis (fungus), a genus of fungi in the family Parmeliaceae, synonym of Xanthoparmelia
 Chondropsis, a genus of plants in the family Gentianaceae, synonym of Exacum